Arihant Majestic Towers is a 17-storied residential building in Chennai, India. At 63 meters, it is one of the first buildings that surpassed the LIC Building on Anna Salai as the tallest building in the city. It remained the tallest building in the city until the Hyatt Regency building was topped out.

The towers
Located on the Inner Ring Road, opposite the Chennai Mofussil Bus Terminus, the complex consists of 310 housing units in 5 towers with a total built-up area of 510,000 sq ft. Built on a 11.7-acre land, the towers are 63 meters in height and have 16 floors. The complex include amenities such as swimming pool, children play area, library, and gymnasium.

See also

 List of tallest buildings in Chennai

References

Residential highrises in Chennai
Buildings and structures completed in 2003
2003 establishments in Tamil Nadu